Bellaire High School is a public high school located in Bellaire, Ohio, United States. It is the only high school in the Bellaire Local School District. Athletic teams compete as the Bellaire Big Reds in the Ohio High School Athletic Association as a member of the Buckeye 8 Athletic League as well as the Ohio Valley Athletic Conference.

History
The first school in Bellaire was organized in 1876; classes met in the First Ward School Building that also housed a public primary school. The school gained its own building in 1925 at the school's present location.

"Bellaire High School, dedicated in 1925, was considered at that time to be the most modern in the Ohio Valley.  Since its inception it has included 30 classrooms, a combination auditorium gym, a library, home economics rooms, chemistry and physics labs, typing room, office practice room, music room and offices of the superintendent of schools, the high school principal and guidance counselor."
(Excerpt from a Times Leader article from February 1, 1999)

Athletics
Bellaire is a founding member of the Ohio Valley Athletic Conference (OVAC), joining the conference in 1943. In 2008, they also founded the Buckeye 8 Conference affiliate of the OVAC.

OVAC 3A Championships
Baseball - 1970, 1976, 1985, 1988, 1993, 2012, 2015
Boys Basketball - 1953, 1967, 1978, 1979, 1988, 1989, 1990, 1991, 1993, 1994, 1995, 1996, 1997, 1999, 2000, 2003, 2005, 2006
Girls Basketball - 1990, 1991, 1993, 1994, 1996, 1998, 2006, 2019
Cheering - 1992
Boys Cross Country - 1970, 1971, 1976, 1978, 2001, 2004, 2005, 2014, 2015
Girls Cross Country - 2002, 2003, 2004, 2005, 2014, 2015, 2016
Football - 1946, 1950, 1954, 1964, 1988, 1993, 1994, 1995, 1996, 1997, 2003, 2005, 2006, 2013, 2021
Softball - 1994, 1996, 1997, 1999, 2003, 2015
Boys Track - 1950, 1951, 1958, 1959, 1960, 1961, 1963, 1977, 1978, 1984, 1985, 1986, 1987, 1990, 1991, 1992, 1993, 2001, 2003, 2004, 2005, 2006, 2016, 2017
Girls Track - 1995, 2001, 2002, 2003, 2004, 2005, 2006
Volleyball - 1989, 1991, 1992, 1993
Wrestling - 1977, 1978

Notable alumni

 Mike Basrak – Pittsburgh Steelers
 Mac Cara – Pittsburgh Steelers
 Nate Davis – San Francisco 49ers
 Jose Davis – Indiana Firebirds (AFL), Colorado Crush (AFL)
 Andy Dorris – St. Louis Cardinals, New Orleans Saints, Seattle Seahawks, Houston Oilers
 Todd Fitch — college football coach
 Tod Goodwin – New York Giants
 Joey Galloway – Seattle Seahawks, Dallas Cowboys, Tampa Bay Buccaneers, currently an ESPN broadcaster for college football
 Ron Lee (American football) – Baltimore Colts
 Stan Olejniczak – Pittsburgh Steelers
 Bull Polisky – Chicago Bears
 Nick Skorich – player for Pittsburgh Steelers, (Head Coach) Cleveland Browns, Philadelphia Eagles
 Lance Mehl – New York Jets
 Ben Taylor – Cleveland Browns, Green Bay Packers
 Chalmers Tschappat – Dayton Triangles
 Clyde Thomas – Philadelphia Eagles, CFL British Columbia Lions, only African-American to serve on city council of Wheeling, WV
 John Buddenberg – Cleveland Browns, Atlanta Falcons, WLAF Sacramento Surge, CFL
 Roger Mass – Wilmington Clippers
 Shag Thomas – Ohio State football, Pro Wrestler

References

External links
Bellaire High School photos on the Bellaire Public Library website
Bellaire Big Reds Football
Bellaire High School Alumni Association

High schools in Belmont County, Ohio
Public high schools in Ohio
1875 establishments in Ohio